Sovétsky Soyúz was a magazine published by the Soviet Union. The magazine was established in 1956. It was one of the propaganda magazines of the Soviet Union. There were editions published in France, Italy, Finland and Japan. The magazine had a monthly sports supplement, Sport v SSSR.

References

1956 establishments in the Soviet Union
Defunct political magazines
Magazines established in 1956
Magazines with year of disestablishment missing
Propaganda newspapers and magazines
Russian-language magazines
Political magazines published in Russia
Magazines published in the Soviet Union
Communist magazines